General Conference is a gathering of members of the Church of Jesus Christ of Latter-day Saints (LDS Church), held biannually every April and October at the Conference Center in Salt Lake City, Utah. During each conference, church members gather in a series of two-hour sessions to listen to the faith's leaders. It consists of five general sessions. From April 2018 to April 2021, the priesthood session was held during the April conference, with a General Women's Session (for females 11 years and older) held during October's conference. The Saturday evening session was changed to a general session in October 2021. The conference also generally includes training sessions for general and area leaders. Although each general conference originates from Salt Lake City, the conference is considered an international event for the church. The sessions are broadcast worldwide in over 90 languages, primarily through local and international media outlets, and over the Internet.

History and structure

In the LDS Church, general conference is a series of semiannual meetings where general authorities and other church leaders preach sermons and give guidance to church members. Changes to church leadership are also proposed and sustained through the principle of common consent. General conferences are held on the weekends of the first Sundays in April and October. The April conference is known as the Annual General Conference, with the October conference referred to as the Semiannual General Conference. The April conference includes a financial audit report not included in the October meeting. Both conferences are identified by the number of years since the church was founded in April 1830; thus, the April 2020 sessions constituted the 190th Annual General Conference, and the October 2020 sessions constituted the 190th Semiannual General Conference.
 
Since October 1848, all of the conferences have been held in Salt Lake City, Utah, with the exception of the April 1877 conference, which was held in St. George, Utah. Conferences were held in a bowery in Salt Lake City from 1848 to 1852, in the Old Salt Lake Tabernacle from 1852 to 1867, in the Salt Lake Tabernacle from October 1867 to October 1999, and in the Conference Center since that time. Historically, sessions were held over three days, with the annual conference always including April 6, the anniversary of the church's organization. This made conference participation difficult for those with work and school commitments when April 6 fell on a weekday. In April 1977, during Spencer W. Kimball's presidency, changes were made to reduce the conference to the first Sunday of April and October and the preceding Saturday.

Historically, beginning in 1994, a women's general meeting was held on Saturday a week prior to the general sessions of the October conference, with a general meeting for young women held at a similar time before the April conference. In November 2013, church leadership announced that beginning in 2014 these meetings for women would be replaced by a semiannual General Women's Meeting for those eight years of age and older. In October 2014, the First Presidency announced that it "has decided that the General Women's Meeting will be designated as the General Women's Session of general conference." 

Since April 2018, the conference has consisted of four general sessions for all members and friends of the church, held at 10:00 AM and 2:00 PM MT on both Saturday and Sunday. Another general session targeted to specific groups is held on Saturday evening. In October 2017, the First Presidency had announced that, beginning in April 2018, the Priesthood Session for all holders of the Aaronic or Melchizedek priesthoods would occur during the April conference, with a General Women's Session for all women and girls ages 11 or older held during October's conference.  These sessions occur during the Saturday evening time previously used for the Priesthood Session.

Tickets to the conference are free of charge and church members can obtain them either from local leaders or by writing to church headquarters. Due to demand, the church often restricts the number of separate session tickets issued to attendees (meaning that it is difficult or impossible for most people to acquire tickets to multiple sessions for the same conference weekend). Standby tickets are also available, as frequently many ticket holders are not able to attend.

The proceedings of a general conference are traditionally been conducted in English, although for a short time, beginning in October 2014, speakers delivering sermons had the option of speaking in their native language. The proceedings are translated and broadcast in over 90 different languages worldwide.

Adjustments in 2020
In October 2019, church president Russell M. Nelson announced that the following April's general conference would be "unlike any other" and would celebrate the bicentennial of events that served as "the very foundation of the restoration", and encouraged church members to prepare for the occasion. In November 2019, it was announced that the traditional Priesthood Session for all male church members 11 and older would be replaced by a Saturday Evening Session for all members of the church, age 11 and older.  Church leaders subsequently announced that a multi-cultural choir would provide the music at that Saturday Evening Session. 

However, due to the COVID-19 pandemic, church leaders announced on March 11, 2020 that the sessions of General Conference, which was planned to convene in the Conference Center, would be held virtually and would be closed to the public. As the pandemic continued to have a widespread impact on a global basis, church leaders announced additional adjustments on March 19, 2020. That announcement noted that the First Presidency would preside at the conference and conduct each session, but that each session would originate from a small auditorium on Temple Square. The music for each session had been prerecorded, and attendance at each session was restricted to the First Presidency and those speaking or praying during that session.

In June 2020, the church announced that the general conference in October 2020 would be held in the same way April's conference had been. During October's conference, most of the members of the Quorum of the Twelve Apostles also attended each of the four general sessions.

2021 conferences

April
In January 2021, due to the ongoing COVID-19 pandemic, the church announced that April 2021's conference would follow the same format and parameters as the previous two, with a Priesthood Session held on Saturday evening as usual. Subsequently, with the conference coinciding with the observance of Easter Sunday, the church noted that the Sunday Morning Session would have a special emphasis on Jesus Christ and the resurrection. For the first time, remarks from general authority seventies serving outside the United States were prerecorded and shown, in addition to prerecorded music from around the world. The Sunday morning session consisted of speakers from every major area in which the church is established.

October

Saturday Evening Session
In early June 2021, the church announced that the Saturday evening session of conference would be discontinued, beginning with October 2021. This decision stemmed from sessions being more widely available throughout the world. 

Subsequently, in late July 2021, the church reinstated the Saturday Evening Session, in order to allow more general church leaders to speak. Rather than being targeted to a specific demographic group, the session would be intended for all members and friends of the church.

Tabernacle Choir
In July 2021, the Tabernacle Choir at Temple Square announced a phased return to normal operations. As part of this return, the Choir sang in three sessions of the October 2021 General Conference. The Choir was divided in half, with one half singing for the Saturday Morning Session, while the other half sang in the Sunday Morning and Afternoon sessions.

2022 conferences

April
In February 2022, the church announced that a Women's Session would be held in April. All women and girls turning 12 or older in 2022 were invited. The church further announced that, due to the ongoing renovation of the Salt Lake Temple, only 10,000 of the Conference Center's seats would be available for each session, and that members traveling to the conference were encouraged to use public transit.

October
In September 2022, the church announced that five general sessions would be open to all members and friends of the church. The announcement also noted that, while in-person attendance would be permitted, seating in the Conference Center would be limited, due to the ongoing renovation of the Salt Lake Temple and Temple Square.

Organization

A member of the church's First Presidency normally conducts each conference session, with the church president presiding. (On occasions in the past, when part or all of the First Presidency have been absent, the First Presidency designates someone to conduct the conference, typically the most senior apostle not in the First Presidency.) The conducting official introduces the various speakers, which over the course of the sessions will generally include all members of the First Presidency and Quorum of the Twelve Apostles and a selection of other leaders in the church. Almost every general authority of the church is present, though outside the First Presidency and Twelve only a few speak. Non–general authority speakers may include male and female officers of auxiliary organizations. Most area seventies travel to Utah to attend at least one general conference per year.

During one general session (usually Saturday afternoon), all the general authorities and general officers of the church are presented for the formal sustaining vote by the membership, and it is usually at this time that any changes among the general church leadership are announced. Normally, the members of the First Presidency and Quorum of the Twelve are mentioned by name; those in other positions are mentioned by name only if they are released from a previous position or called to a new one. The person conducting asks all of those who are in favor of sustaining the current leadership or the calling of a new leader to raise their hand in a "vote." He then asks that any who are opposed raise their hand. Dissenting votes are rare and the customary declaration at the end of the voting is that the voting has been unanimous.

At the first General Conference after the death of a church president and the calling of his successor, the session at which the sustaining vote takes place is called a solemn assembly. At a solemn assembly, groups of Latter-day Saints are asked to stand in succession and sustain the new president of the church. Typically, the order is: First Presidency, the Quorum of the Twelve, the Quorums of Seventy, Melchizedek priesthood holders, Aaronic priesthood holders, Relief Society members, members of the Young Women organization, and then all members together. Then the names of all other general authorities are read, and a sustaining and opposing vote is called for.

Frequently, significant announcements are made at a General Conference, which may include the announcement of locations for new temples, adjustments to organizations, or changes in practice or policy.

Music
Music is an important part of the conference in setting the appropriate spiritual mood. The Tabernacle Choir at Temple Square, formerly known as the Mormon Tabernacle Choir, accompanied by tabernacle organists, generally provides the majority of the music, with the exception of the Saturday afternoon, priesthood sessions, and general women's sessions. At the Saturday afternoon session and the priesthood session guest ensembles include regional choirs, institute choirs, an MTC choir, and the BYU Choirs. The hymns are usually selected from the normal repertoire of LDS hymns and their various arrangements, with an occasional piece from traditional sacred choral repertoire. Usually, the congregation is invited to stand and join in with one hymn halfway through each session.

Very rarely, soloist artists will perform for Conferences, The last performer to do so, Liriel Domiciano, did so alongside the Tabernacle Choir at Temple Square.

Sermons
Members of the church regard and sustain the president of the church, the counselors in the First Presidency, and members of the Quorum of Twelve Apostles as "prophets, seers, and revelators", and are counseled to pay close attention to what they teach throughout the year. However, the sermons given at general conference are held in particularly high esteem and they are considered the will of God to the church members at the current time.  The sermons (called "talks") are published in Liahona, an official church magazine, the month following a General Conference. They are also translated and printed in non-English versions of Liahona. Church members are encouraged to read and study the talks, discuss them at home and at church, and quote from them while giving lessons and sermons at church.

A sample of the topics of general conference discourses includes:
Our Good Shepherd (Renlund, April 2017)
Unity (Eyring, October 2008)
Forgiveness (Faust, April 2007; Hinckley, October 2005)
Natural disasters and preparedness (Hinckley, October 2005)
Faith (Sorensen, April 2005)
The dangers of pornography (Oaks, April 2005; Hinckley, October 2004)
The first vision of Joseph Smith (Uchtdorf, April 2005)
Acquiring a testimony of Jesus (McMullin, April 2004)
Fatherhood (Perry, April 2004)
The Atonement of Jesus (Hafen, April 2004)
Fasting (Pratt, October 2004)
Repentance (Nelson, April 2007; Uchtdorf, April 2007; Oaks, October 2003)
Eternal life through Jesus (Madsen, April 2002)
Tithing (Tingey, April 2002)
Hope in the Atonement of Jesus (Faust, October 2001)
The Book of Mormon: Another Testament of Jesus Christ (Packer, October 2001)

Broadcasting
The events of the conferences are televised both locally and internationally through various platforms to increase their exposure and availability. Sessions are broadcast on screens in various buildings on Temple Square, including the Tabernacle, Assembly Hall and the Joseph Smith Memorial Building. The conference sessions are also broadcast via satellite to church meetinghouses throughout the world, either simultaneously or time delayed to accommodate differing time zones and languages. The conferences have also aired through webcasts, and since 2010, the complete sermons have been posted on the church's YouTube channel. The sessions are translated and broadcast in over 100 different languages worldwide.

General Conference was first broadcast on television in October 1949. General Conference was first interpreted in multiple languages in 1961 (Dutch, German, Samoan, and Spanish).

Live coverage of the conferences are also shown on local television and radio stations with ties to the Church. These include Utah's NBC affiliate KSL-TV and ABC News Radio affiliate KSL (AM)/FM (owned by Bonneville International, a commercial broadcasting arm of the church), KBYU-FM and KBYU-TV (public broadcasters owned by Brigham Young University), Latter-day Saints Channel (the church-owned radio network, which also has additional HD Radio coverage in Bonneville markets), KIXR 1400 K-Star, KUTN Star 96.7, KMGR 99.1 Classy FM, BYU Television (national cable and satellite, and over KBYU-DT2), and BYU Radio.

See also 

 General conference (Latter Day Saints)
 June Conference
 We Thank Thee, O God, for a Prophet
 World Conference (Community of Christ)

Notes

References 

.
.
.
.
.
.
.
.
.
.
.
.
.
.
.

Further reading

External links

 Official website
 Official listing of cable/radio accessibility
 LDS Church Conference Reports (October 1897 – 2011)

1830 in Christianity
International conferences in the United States
Recurring events established in 1830
The Church of Jesus Christ of Latter-day Saints in Utah
Worship services of the Church of Jesus Christ of Latter-day Saints
Semiannual events
1830 establishments in New York (state)
Latter Day Saint conferences
April observances
October observances